Wikstroemia monnula is a shrub in the family Thymelaeaceae. It is native to southern Anhui, Jiangxi, Guangdong, Guangxi, Guizhou, Hunan, and Zhejiang.

Description
The shrub grows from 0.5 to 0.8 m tall. Its branches are yellowish green and angular. It is often found on shrubby slopes and roadsides at altitudes of 600 to 1100 m.

References

monnula